The Orielton Lagoon is a shallow dystrophic lagoon located west of Sorell in south east Tasmania, Australia.

Description
It is a Ramsar Wetland, providing habitat for migratory shorebirds and regionally significant flora and fauna. The lagoon is part of the South Arm Important Bird Area (IBA), identified as such by BirdLife International because of its importance for the conservation of pied oystercatchers and of the migratory waders, or shorebirds, of the East Asian – Australasian Flyway.

See also

 List of Ramsar sites in Australia
List of reservoirs and dams in Tasmania
List of lakes in Tasmania

References

Lagoons of Australia
East Coast Tasmania
Important Bird Areas of Tasmania
Ramsar sites in Australia
Lakes of Tasmania